Events from the year 1845 in France.

Incumbents
 Monarch – Louis Philippe I

Events
12 October – The Société Mathématique de France was founded.
20 November – Battle of Vuelta de Obligado between the Argentine Confederation and an Anglo-French fleet on the waters of the Paraná River.

Arts and literature
 1845 – Mérimée writes Carmen
 1845 – Alexandre Dumas writes La Reine Margot

Births
27 March – Louis Théophile Joseph Landouzy, neurologist (died 1917)
12 May – Henri Brocard, meteorologist and mathematician (died 1922)
12 May – Gabriel Fauré, composer, organist and pianist (died 1924)
18 June – Charles Louis Alphonse Laveran, physician, awarded 1907 Nobel Prize for Physiology or Medicine (died 1922)
18 July – Tristan Corbière, poet (died 1875)
19 August – Edmond James de Rothschild, philanthropist (died 1934)
11 September – Émile Baudot, telegraph engineer (died 1903)
9 October – Ferdinand Arnodin, engineer and industrialist (died 1924)
30 October – Antonin Mercié, sculptor and painter (died 1916)

Full date unknown
Cécile Bruyère, abbess (died 1909)
Jules Develle, politician (died 1919)
Jean-Camille Formigé, architect (died 1926)

Deaths
4 January – Léopold Boilly, painter (born 1761)
13 March – Charles-Guillaume Étienne, dramatist and writer (born 1778)
17 March – Pierre François Marie Auguste Dejean, entomologist (born 1780)
30 March – Alexandre Soumet, poet (born 1788)
9 April – Honoré Théodore Maxime Gazan de la Peyrière, general (born 1765)
21 August – Vincent-Marie Viénot, Count of Vaublanc, politician, writer and artist (born 1756)
23 August – Amédée Louis Michel le Peletier, comte de Saint-Fargeau, entomologist (born 1770)

Full date unknown
Pierre Hyacinthe Azais, philosopher (born 1766)
Éléonore-Louis Godefroi Cavaignac, politician (born 1801)
Philippe de Girard, engineer and inventor of the first flax spinning frame (born 1775)
Jean Henri Jaume Saint-Hilaire, naturalist and artist (born 1772)

References

1840s in France